Onzain is a former commune in the French department of Loir-et-Cher, administrative region of Centre-Val de Loire. On 1 January 2017, it was merged into the new commune Veuzain-sur-Loire. In 2019 its population was 3,246.

Onzain is twinned with Darley Dale, England and with Flein on the southern edge of Heilbronn, Baden-Württemberg, Germany.

See also
Communes of the Loir-et-Cher department

References

Former communes of Loir-et-Cher